Jon MacKinnon (born November 17, 1977 in Winnipeg, Manitoba) is a field hockey goalkeeper from Canada. MacKinnon joined the Junior National Team in 1994 and later served on the Men's National Team.

International senior competitions
 2001 – World Cup Qualifier, Edinburgh (8th)
 2002 – Commonwealth Games, Manchester (6th)
 2003 – Pan American Games, Santo Domingo (2nd)
 2004 – Olympic Qualifying Tournament, Madrid (11th)
 2004 – Pan Am Cup, London (2nd)

References

1977 births
Living people
Canadian male field hockey players
Canadian people of Scottish descent
Field hockey players from Winnipeg
Field hockey players at the 2003 Pan American Games